Andrew Roseberry (born 2 April 1971) is a former English cricketer.  Roseberry was a right-handed batsman who bowled right-arm medium pace.  He was born at Sunderland, County Durham.

Roseberry made his first-class debut for Leicestershire in 1992 against the touring Pakistanis, in what was his only first-class appearance for the county.

Roseberry joined Northumberland in 1993, where he made his Minor Counties Championship against Bedfordshire.  From 1993 to 1997, he represented the county in 19 Minor Counties Championship fixtures and 6 MCCA Knockout Trophy matches.

In 1994, Roseberry joined Glamorgan, where he made his County Championship debut against Sussex.  He played 5 more first-class fixtures for Glamorgan in 1994, with his final first-class match coming against Hampshire.  In his 7 first-class matches, he scored 263 runs at a batting average of 29.22, with 2 half centuries and a high score of 94.

Family
His brother Mike played cricket for Middlesex, Durham County Cricket Club and the Marylebone Cricket Club.

References

External links
Andrew Roseberry at Cricinfo
Andrew Roseberry at CricketArchive

1971 births
Living people
Cricketers from Sunderland
English cricketers
Leicestershire cricketers
Northumberland cricketers
Glamorgan cricketers
People educated at Durham School